Al Ta'awon is a Libyan football club based in Ajdabya which plays in the Libyan Premier League.

References 

Al Ta'awon
1960 establishments in Libya
Association football clubs established in 1960